Node.Hack is a tap and play-style strategy game available for Android, iOS, Windows Phone, and Kindle Fire, developed by American studio 4gency and originally released in 2012.

References 

AppSpy review
Pocket Gamer review
148apps review

External links 
Official website

2012 video games
Android (operating system) games
IOS games
Strategy video games
Video games developed in the United States
Windows Phone games